Lucignano may refer to:

Lucignano, a municipality in the province of Arezzo, Italy
Lucignano, Montespertoli, a village in the metropolitan city of Florence, Italy
Lucignano d'Arbia, a village in the province of Siena, Italy
Lucignano d'Asso, a village in the province of Siena, Italy
Lucignano in Chianti, a village in the province of Siena, Italy